Raja Azam Khan Amacha is a Pakistani politician and member of the Gilgit Baltistan Assembly. He became Head of the ruling family of the former princely state of Shigar after the death of his father Raja Muhammad Ali Shah Saba.

Political career
Raja Azam Khan Amacha contested the 2020 Gilgit-Baltistan Assembly election on 15 November 2020 from constituency GBA-12 (Shigar) on the ticket of Pakistan Tehreek-e-Insaf. He won the election by a margin of 1,788 votes over the runner-up Imran Nadeem of Pakistan Peoples Party. He garnered 10,674 votes while Nadeem received 8,886 votes.

References

Living people
Gilgit-Baltistan MLAs 2020–2025
Politicians from Gilgit-Baltistan
Year of birth missing (living people)